Alexander Anatolyevich Kuzyukov (born 7 August 1987) is a Russian wheelchair fencer, who won gold in the men's épée B event at the 2020 Summer Paralympics. He is a two-time Paralympic champion, three-time world champion, three-time European champion, and 23-time champion of Russia. He is a Merited Master of Sport of Russia.

Early life
Kuzyukov was born 1987 in the workers' settlement of Maryanovka, Omsk Oblast. In childhood he practiced running, swimming and basketball. At the age of eighteen he had an employment injury on a construction site, receiving a spinal compression fracture and the loss of ability to walk. After the injury he decided to take up Paralympic fencing (sitting fencing). He attended the recently established section in Omsk, with his first coach being Valery Petrovich Purtov.

Personal life
Kuzyukov enrolled at the Siberian Automobile and Highway University with a degree in "Economics and Management in Companies" and at the Siberian State Academy of Physical Culture and Sports with a degree in "Coach Instructor in Physical Culture and Sports".

References

1987 births
Living people
Russian male fencers
Wheelchair fencers at the 2012 Summer Paralympics
Wheelchair fencers at the 2020 Summer Paralympics
Medalists at the 2020 Summer Paralympics
Paralympic gold medalists for Russia
Paralympic medalists in wheelchair fencing
Paralympic wheelchair fencers of Russia
Paralympic gold medalists for the Russian Paralympic Committee athletes
21st-century Russian people